Donkey Kong Land 2  is a platform video game developed by Rare and published by Nintendo for the Game Boy. It is the sequel to the 1995 Game Boy game Donkey Kong Land and is part of the Donkey Kong video game series. It was released worldwide in Autumn 1996. It was enhanced for the Super Game Boy with different shades of color, as well as a 16-bit banana border on the edges of the television screen. Like the original Donkey Kong Land, it came packaged in a banana-yellow cartridge. The game was followed by Donkey Kong Land III, which was released in 1997.

Gameplay 

Nintendo Power described the game as a conversion of Donkey Kong Country 2: Diddy's Kong Quest.

Plot 
Donkey Kong Land 2 stars Diddy Kong and Dixie Kong in their quest to rescue Donkey Kong from Kaptain K. Rool and the Kremling Krew. While its stage names and world themes are borrowed from Donkey Kong Country 2: Diddy's Kong Quest (except for Castle Crush, which became Dungeon Danger; and Haunted Hall, which became Krazy Koaster), the level designs are different.

Donkey Kong Land 2 had the same storyline from Donkey Kong Country 2: Diddy's Kong Quest. The manual contains a simplified version of the story from its SNES counterpart - K. Rool has kidnapped Donkey Kong and is at Crocodile Isle, and it's up to Diddy and Dixie to save him.

Reception 
Donkey Kong Land 2 is rated at 79.00% at GameRankings based on five reviews. Nintendo Power praised the gameplay and graphics but criticized the similarities between the levels and those of Donkey Kong Country 2. GamePro was positive to the game's side-scrolling action, hidden areas, music, and graphics.

Nintendojo gave the game 8.5 out of 10, but was critical to its save system. Nintendo Life gave the Virtual Console re-release a 7 out of 10, praising the amount of content Rare managed to cram into the game but criticizing it for being similar to Diddy's SNES version.

By 1997,  units had been sold worldwide.

See also 
 List of Donkey Kong video games

References

Notes

External links
  

1996 video games
Donkey Kong platform games
Game Boy games
Platform games
Rare (company) games
Video game sequels
Video games about pirates
Video games scored by Grant Kirkhope
Video games featuring female protagonists
Virtual Console games
Virtual Console games for Nintendo 3DS
Video games developed in the United Kingdom
Single-player video games

ja:スーパードンキーコング2#ドンキーコングランド（GB版）